Mobile v. Bolden, 446 U.S. 55 (1980), was a case in which the Supreme Court of the United States held that disproportionate effects alone, absent purposeful discrimination, are insufficient to establish a claim of racial discrimination affecting voting.

In Gomillion v. Lightfoot (1960), which challenged new city boundaries that excluded virtually all black voters from Tuskegee, Alabama, the court had held that creating electoral districts which disenfranchised blacks violated the Fifteenth Amendment. It did not as readily distinguish between intent and results as it would in Mobile.

Background 
In 1911 the state legislature enacted a three-member city commission form of government for the city of Mobile, Alabama. With members elected at-large, the commission exercised all legislative, executive and administrative power. Since the entire city voted for each Commissioner, the white majority generally controlled the elections. At the time both African Americans and poor whites were effectively disenfranchised by practices of the 1901 state constitution.

After African Americans regained the power to register and vote through passage of the Voting Rights Act of 1965, they were discouraged by being unable to elect candidates of their choice to the city commission. The financial and strategic demands for citywide elections made it difficult for them to enter the race, and the white majority tended to support white candidates, particularly as conservatives moved into the Republican Party. African Americans supported Democratic Party candidates.

In the late 1970s, a class-action suit was filed on behalf of all the city's black residents against the city and all three Commissioners by three young civil rights lawyers in Mobile, J.U. Blacksher, Larry Menefee and Gregory B. Stein. They received assistance from Edward Still of Birmingham and NAACP Legal Defense attorneys Jack Greenberg, James W. Nabrit III and Charles E. Williams. Their complaint alleged that the city's electoral system violated the Fourteenth and Fifteenth amendments and Section 2 of the Voting Rights Act of 1965, among other laws. The city hired C.B. Arendall, Jr, who assisted David A. Bagwell and S.R. Sheppard of the city's legal Department. U.S. District Judge Virgil Pittman found for the city's black residents and the Court of Appeals affirmed. The form of city government was subsequently changed. (See below.)

The Supreme Court agreed to examine the issues to determine whether this at-large system violated Amendments Fourteen or Fifteen, or the Voting Rights Act.

Opinion of the Court 
The Court ruled 6-3 for the city of Mobile. In his plurality opinion, Justice Stewart concluded that the relevant language of the Voting Rights Act paralleled that of the Fifteenth Amendment. Stewart analyzed the Fifteenth Amendment claim, citing "the District Court's findings of fact, unquestioned on appeal, [that] make clear that Negroes register and vote in Mobile 'without hindrance,' and that there are no official obstacles in the way of Negroes who wish to become candidates for election to the Commission." In rejecting the Fifteenth Amendment claims, he held that "action by a State that is racially neutral on its face violates the Fifteenth Amendment only if motivated by a discriminatory purpose," which the District Court had found no evidence for.

The Court similarly rejected the Fourteenth Amendment claims and Justice Marshall's dissenting opinion in favor of finding such claims, stating, "Whatever appeal the dissenting opinion's view may have as a matter of political theory, it is not the law. The Equal Protection Clause of the Fourteenth Amendment does not require proportional representation as an imperative of political organization." Justice Blackmun concurred in the result, but believed the District Court had exceeded its discretion in its order for remedial action, believing the District Court had failed to consider alternative remedies. Justice Stevens concurred in the judgment concerning the constitutionality of Mobile's system, but applied a slightly different standard in his concurring opinion.

The case somewhat limited the court's previous holding in Gomillion.

Result
The Supreme Court remanded the case to the lower court for settlement. U.S. District Judge Virgil Pittman held a second hearing beginning May 1981, by which time the U.S. Department of Justice's Civil Rights Division also intervened on behalf of the plaintiffs, and the law firm of Hand, Arendall, Bedsole, Greaves, and Johnston represented the city. A "smoking gun" letter had been discovered and admitted into evidence—written by Mobile lawyer and Congressman Frederick G. Bromberg to the Alabama legislature in 1909, it advocated the at-large system in order to prevent blacks from holding office. The district court proposed three single-member districts, noting that executive functions could not readily be separated among positions elected in this system. In addition, in this period Congress strengthened Section 2 of the Voting Rights Act with amendments changing the prohibition against "discriminatory intent" to creation of "discriminatory results" standard for use in evaluation of forms of government or electoral practices.

In 1985 Mobile's state legislators proposed a mayor-council form of government for the city, consisting of seven members to be elected from single-member districts, with the mayor to be elected at-large. By that time, Mobile was the last major city in Alabama to retain a city commission form of government. This change was approved by 72% of state voters, including formerly excluded African Americans and poor whites. The change to single-member districts enabled a wider range of candidates to enter politics at the local level. The three African Americans elected to the council that fall became the first blacks to hold city office since Reconstruction. Since the change, African Americans and women have won election to the Mobile city government.

References

External links
 

United States Supreme Court cases
United States Supreme Court cases of the Burger Court
United States Fifteenth Amendment case law
United States equal protection case law
United States electoral redistricting case law
1980 in United States case law
Legal history of Alabama
History of Mobile, Alabama